The Delage D12 is a hybrid street-legal sports car produced by the French automobile manufacturer Delage from 2022.

History 
The French car manufacturer Delage ceased operations in 1953. In 2019, the entrepreneur Laurent Tapie signed an agreement with the owners of the brand “Les Amis of Delage "in order to relaunch the Delage brand and produce the hybrid D12 in the Paris region from 2020.

Presentation 

On December 10 and 11, 2019, the resurrected manufacturer presented the Delage D12 Concept Car to a selection of potential clients in California as a world premiere. Two versions are announced: the D12 GT and the D12 Club. Both have the same carbon chassis, the same naturally aspirated 7.6L V12 engine developing 990hp and are intended to be homologated to be street legal in the United States, in Europe, and in most major markets. 
It is on the hybridization that the technical sheet changes: the GT has a 110hp electric engine (bringing the total power to 1,100hp) while the Club contains an electric engine of only 20hp (for 1,010hp of total power), but the Club is 90kg lighter (1300 kg dry weight versus 1390 kg for the GT). The GT will accelerate (even) stronger but on track, because of its greater lightness, the Club will lap faster.
Delage wishes to homologate the D12 in the European Union in 2023 to then try to beat, with the D12 Club version, the record of the legendary Nürburgring race track in Germany in the car category homologated for the road.

Delage's technical team is based in Magny-Cours where the D12 is regularly tested on the nearby F1 track of Magny-Cours.
This technical team of talents has accumulated 16 FIA World Champion titles, including 1997 F1 World Champion Jacques Villeneuve, in charge of the final settings of the car, so that its driving provides the closest sensations ever achieved to those driving an F1 car on open road .

The D12 costs 2 million euros, excluding taxes and options.

It will be produced in only 30 copies, and will be followed by other models of Delage hypercars.

Characteristics 

The D12 is an attempt to offer the closest road-legal car ever made to a Formula 1, using a Monocoque and frontal crash-box in carbon, along with full carbon bodywork with active aerodynamics (front wings, airbrakes, rear wing), offering more than double the downforce of all cars currently road legal in the European Union. Delage is the only street legal car manufacturer with the rights to use Mauro Bianchi's contractive suspension patents for a road car. This design revolutionized F1 in 1998 and currently equips all F1 cars. The Delage has a central driving position, as in Formula 1, albeit with space for a passenger behind the driver, in tandem. While there is a canopy there are no traditional doors, and there is a "Speedster" option which incorporates a smaller windscreen and also an "F1" option with a wind deflector and no windscreen. As in Formula 1, Delage also has triple flow brake cooling, and a full carbon rim with a "fan" cooling effect

Other characteristics include an interior fully tailor-made for each customer on all its contact points: seat (full carbon), F1 type steering wheel handles, and pedal placement.

Innovative hybridization 

The D12 Hybrid Hypercar is powered by a 990 hp 7.6-litre naturally aspirated V12 engine. It is developed by Delage. 
According to the refounder of the brand, it is "based on an existing engine" but the detailed information is reserved for Delage clients.

The internal combustion engine is coupled to an innovative electric motor: whether it is in the 20hp or 110hp version, it operates at low voltage, unlike all the powerful motors of current electric vehicles which require 400 or even 800 volts of electric tension. These high tensions justify the reinforcements required for the crash tests of electric vehicles by the approval authorities (in Europe and elsewhere), because the occupants could be electrocuted in the event of contact with the electrical wires.

By developing a low-voltage electric motorization, Delage wishes to open the way to electric vehicles that are safe from the point of view of electrical voltage level, and thus do not require the specific reinforcements of crash tests. According to Laurent Tapie "this would save cost and weight, two of the major problems of current electric vehicles."

For the refounder of Delage, "we are above all a technological innovation company that makes hypercars, and not the opposite. Our hypercars will serve as a showcase for our technologies, which are intended to participate in the virtuous transformation of automobiles in the future."

Concept Car 2019 

The D12 is prefigured by the concept car of the Delage D12 presented on 10 December 2019 in Los Angeles in United States.

D12 Speedster & D12 "F1" 
Delage unveiled in September 2022 a cabriolet version of the D12 called D12 Speedster (due to the smaller windscreen), and an "F1 type" version without a windscreen but with a wind deflector and, if the customer wishes, a Formula 1-type halo.

In both cases, the customer can convert his D12 coupé himself in a few minutes using a manual conversion system, offered as an option.

Notes and references 

D12
Hybrid electric cars
Sports cars
2020s cars
Cars introduced in 2019